The Shark (French:Le requin) is a 1930 French film directed by Henri Chomette and starring Albert Préjean, Gina Manès and Daniel Mendaille. Made in 1929 but released the following year, it was one of the first French sound films.

The story concerns a shipowner who on the edge of financial failure, bribes accomplices to sink his ship for the insurance. He is accused of fraud and it come to court but he  acquitted only to be shot dead by his wife who narrowly escaped the sinking.

The film's sets were designed by Lazare Meerson.

Cast
 Albert Préjean as Le capitaine  
 Gina Manès as Violette  
 Daniel Mendaille as Le second  
 Rudolf Klein-Rogge as Vasseur  
 Samson Fainsilber as L'avocat  
 Nicole de Rouves 
 Edmond Van Daële as Le radio  
 Andrée Standart as L'amie d'un soir  
 Pierre Juvenet as L'avocat général  
 Hubert Daix as Le courtier  
 André Allard as Le président

References

Bibliography 
 Bock, Hans-Michael & Bergfelder, Tim. The Concise CineGraph. Encyclopedia of German Cinema. Berghahn Books, 2009.

External links 
 

1930 films
1930s French-language films
Films directed by Henri Chomette
French black-and-white films
French drama films
1930 drama films
1930s French films